Cobalt tetracarbonyl hydride is an organometallic compound with the formula HCo(CO)4. It is a volatile, yellow liquid that forms a colorless vapor and has an intolerable odor. The compound readily decomposes upon melt and in absentia of high CO partial pressures forms Co2(CO)8. Despite operational challenges associated with its handling, the compound has received considerable attention for its ability to function as a catalyst in hydroformylation.  In this respect, HCo(CO)4 and related derivatives have received significant academic interest for their ability to mediate a variety of carbonylation (introduction of CO into inorganic compounds) reactions.

Structure and properties

HCo(CO)4 adopts trigonal bipyramidal structure, with the hydride ligand occupying one of the axial positions, giving an overall symmetry of C3v. The three equatorial CO ligands are slightly bent out of the equatorial plane. The Co–CO and Co–H bond distances were determined by gas-phase electron diffraction to be 1.764 and 1.556 Å, respectively. Assuming the presence of a formal hydride ion, the oxidation state of cobalt in this compound is +1.

But unlike some other transition-metal hydrides complexes, HCo(CO)4 is highly acidic, with a pKa of 8.5. It readily undergoes substitution by tertiary phosphines and other Lewis-bases.  For example, triphenylphosphine gives HCo(CO)3PPh3 and HCo(CO)2(PPh3)2. These derivatives are more stable than HCo(CO)4 and are used industrially to improve catalyst selectivity in hydroformylation. These derivatives are generally less acidic than HCo(CO)4.

Preparation
Tetracarbonylhydrocobalt was first described by Hieber in the early 1930s. It was the second transition metal hydride to be discovered, after H2Fe(CO)4. It is prepared by reducing Co2(CO)8 with sodium amalgam or a similar reducing agent followed by acidification.

Co2(CO)8 + 2 Na  →  2 NaCo(CO)4
NaCo(CO)4 + H+  →  HCo(CO)4 + Na+

Since HCo(CO)4 decomposes so readily, it is usually generated in situ by hydrogenation of Co2(CO)8.
Co2(CO)8 + H2    2 HCo(CO)4

The thermodynamic parameters for the equilibrium reaction were determined by infrared spectroscopy to be ΔH = 4.054 kcal mol−1, ΔS = −3.067 cal mol−1 K−1.

Applications
Tetracarbonylhydridocobalt was the first transition metal hydride to be used in industry. In 1953 evidence was disclosed that it is the active catalyst for the conversion of alkenes, CO, and H2 to  aldehydes, a process known as hydroformylation (oxo reaction).  Although the use of cobalt-based hydroformylation has since been largely superseded by rhodium-based catalysts, the world output of C3–C18 aldehydes produced by tetracarbonylhydrocobalt catalysis is about 100,000 tons/year, roughly 2% of the total.

References

Organocobalt compounds
Metal hydrides
Carbonyl complexes
Substances discovered in the 1930s